Partizanski vrh may refer to: 

Jelovica, a karst plateau in northwestern Slovenia with a prominence called Partizanski vrh
Sveta Planina, a settlement in the Municipality of Trbovlje, known as Partizanski vrh from 1955 to 2002